"Walk" is a song by American rock band Foo Fighters, released as the third single from their seventh studio album Wasting Light. It was written by Dave Grohl and co-produced by Butch Vig.

Release and reception
The song was released on June 6, 2011, to rock radio. No physical CD single was released; it is only a digital downloadable single. The song reached number one on the Billboard Rock Songs chart on July 20, 2011, dethroning the album's previous single "Rope", giving the band their third number one single on the chart - the most on the chart so far. On February 12, 2012, the song won two awards at the 54th Grammy Awards for Best Rock Performance and Best Rock Song. They also performed the song live at the Grammys.

Song information
According to Dave Grohl, he came up with the verse about "having a trial" after the time he was helping his first daughter Violet Maye on "learning to walk", and eventually she was able to walk on her own. The song was supposed to be on the previous studio album Echoes, Silence, Patience & Grace, but Dave decided to put the final version as the last track of Wasting Light because it "sort of makes sense to the album's theme of time and second chances" and to "end the record on a positive note". Grohl added that the optimistic tone was a reminiscence on how bad he felt after Kurt Cobain killed himself and wanting others to realize "in life, you get trapped in crisis, where you imagine there’s no way out. When really, if you dare to consider that crisis a blip on the radar, it’s easier to push through. And, yeah, I was just like, ‘I don’t want anyone to have that feeling that I had that morning.’ ” Pat Smear, who played with Grohl and Cobain in Nirvana, considers "Walk" and its lyrics about enjoying life an antithesis to the Nirvana song "I Hate Myself and Want to Die".

Music video
The music video appeared on YouTube on June 2, 2011. The video, directed by Sam Jones, was the second video released from Wasting Light, and is an homage to Joel Schumacher's 1993 movie Falling Down.

In 2011, the video won Best Rock Video at the 2011 MTV Video Music Awards.

Personnel
 Dave Grohl – lead vocals, rhythm guitar
 Chris Shiflett – lead guitar
 Pat Smear – guitar
 Nate Mendel – bass
 Taylor Hawkins – drums

In pop culture
 Despite not being included on the soundtrack, "Walk" can be heard in the background of the bar scene and in the end credits to the 2011 Marvel superhero film Thor. 
 HBO aired a promo featuring the song to promote their 2011 summer/fall programming line up.
 The song was made as downloadable content for the videogames Rock Band 3 and Rocksmith.
 WWE used "Walk" to highlight Edge twice where it was first heard in a video package for his induction into the 2012 WWE Hall of Fame, and again at the conclusion of the WWE 24 documentary episode "Edge: The Second Mountain". 
 A.J. Ellis of the Los Angeles Dodgers uses the song when he walks up to bat.
 The song was featured in the documentary Warren Miller's ...Like There's No Tomorrow.
 In the opening chapter of The Dresden Files novel Cold Days, the title character talks about remembering his physical rehabilitation in Arctis Tor as a montage set to "Walk".
 On WIBC 93.1 FM Indianapolis, the show Chicks On The Right used "Walk" as their theme song.
 The song was featured in the trailer to the Robert Zemeckis film, Welcome to Marwen.
 An instrumental version of the song appeared in the 2020 T-Mobile commercials.

Charts

Weekly charts

Year-end charts

Decade-end charts

Certifications

Awards

References

Foo Fighters songs
2011 singles
Songs written by Dave Grohl
Song recordings produced by Butch Vig
Grammy Award for Best Rock Song
Songs written by Pat Smear
Songs written by Taylor Hawkins
Songs written by Nate Mendel
Songs written by Chris Shiflett
RCA Records singles